Ileal Interposition is a Metabolic Surgery procedure, used to treat overweight diabetic patients through surgical means. First presented by the Brazilian surgeon Aureo De Paula in 1999, this technique is applied by placing ileum, which is the distal part of the small intestine, either between stomach and the proximal part of the small intestine (1) or by placing the ileum to the proximal part of the small intestine without touching the natural connections of the stomach (2).
There are 2 different versions of the operation. Sleeve gastrectomy procedure is standard for both of the versions.

Diverted (Duodeno-ileal interposition)
In addition to sleeve gastrectomy procedure, the connection between the stomach and the duodenum is closed off from the level of the second segment of the duodenum. While preserving the last 30 cm part of the small intestine, a 170 cm segment of ileum is prepared and connected to the first segment of the duodenum, which is at the end of the stomach. The other end of the ileum segment is connected to the proximal part of the small intestine. Thus, distal part of the small intestine is ‘’interposed’’ between proximal part of the small intestine and the stomach. Since duodenum and the proximal part of the small intestine is disabled, a partial bypass is in question. Patients who undergo this operation achieve better weight and blood sugar control, but face anemia (iron deficiency) risk because of the bypass procedure.

Non-Diverted (Jejuno-ileal interposition)
In addition to sleeve gastrectomy procedure, a 200 cm segment of ileum is prepared while preserving the last 30 cm part of the small intestine and then ‘’interposed’’ to the proximal part of the small intestine. Thanks to this, food continue to pass throughout the entire small intestine. No malabsorption is in question in this technique, and the food is absorbed by the duodenum as well. Since negative hormones secreted from the duodenum are quite effective in the surgical treatment of diabetes, this operation offers effective weight control, but has limited effect on blood sugar control.

Medical uses
Type 2 diabetic patients who cannot achieve blood sugar control despite appropriate treatment or suffering from organ damage should consider this operation. This is not a standard treatment for patients with low body mass index, and should only be performed in accordance with certain clinic protocols.

Physiology 

1) Increase of GLP-1 levels because of early food contact with ileum mucosa, which in turn regulates early phase insulin secretion (jejuno ileal nutrient sensing)

2) Regulation of late term glucose dependent (20–120 minutes) plasma insulin response because of GIP effect (duodenal exclusion)

3) Decrease of hepatic and peripheral insulin resistance

4) Calorie restriction and weight control dependent on hormonal thermostat mechanism

5) Increased gastric emptying and decreased ghrelin levels

6) Regulation of late phase insufficient glucagon suppression

7) Reduction of increased hepatic glucose output

8) Resolution/control of type 2 diabetes and accompanying co-morbidities

Complication 
Complication Rates = %4 - 6,5

Mortality Rates= %0,1-0,27

Infection: %0,4 - 0,55

Venous Thromboembolism: %0,1 - 0,27

Hemorrhage: %11,8

Hernia: Unreported

Bowel obstruction: %0,3-0,5

Technical Complications:

Anastomosis Leak: %1 - 2,2

Narrowness: %1 - 1,4

Ulceration: %0,8 - 1,2

Dumping Syndrome: %0,2 - 0,4

Absorption and Nutrition Disorders: 0,5 - 1,6

Results and benefits
Two important advantages and one disadvantage about Ileal Transposition (Interposition) have been reported. First of the advantages is that it can be performed on patients with a broad range of BMI (Body Mass Index), and the other one is that with the exception of patients who already need iron, B12 vitamin and D vitamin supplement prior to the surgery, the operation does not necessitate any additional vitamin supplement. Its disadvantage is that the operation technically quite challenging because it consists of numerous stages and therefore require serious training and technical expertise.

Costs
Longer operation times than other procedures (3-3.5 hours), the need of technologically more advanced equipment and longer hospitalization cause higher costs than other commonly used, simpler procedures with limited effectiveness. Reported costs change between 15,000-25,000 USD.

The operations
Ileal Transposition / Interposition should only be performed by surgeons with a dedicated team who received appropriate training and performed at least 100 operations under supervision. It should not be forgotten that even though this operation can provide miraculous results, it can lead to disastrous outcomes when performed by people who do not have the necessary qualifications.

References

1) Celik A, Asci M, Celik BO, Ugale S. The impact of laparoscopic diverted sleeve gastrectomy with ileal transposition (DSIT) on short term diabetic medication costs. SpringerPlus. 2015; 14(4): 417-422.
2) Celik A, Ugale S, Ofluoglu H, Vural E, Cagiltay E, Cat H, Asci M, Celik BO. Metabolic Outcomes of Laparoscopic Diverted Sleeve Gastrectomy with Ileal Transposition (DSIT) in Obese Type 2 Diabetic Patients. Obes Surg. 2015 Apr 19. PubMed .
3) Çelik A, Ugale S, Ofluoğlu H. Laparoscopic diverted resleeve with ileal transposition for failed laparoscopic sleeve gastrectomy: a case report. Surg Obes Relat Dis. 2015; 11(1): e5-7.
4) Celik A, Ugale S, Ofluoglu H, Asci M, Celik BO, Vural E, Aydin M. Technical feasibility and safety profile of laparoscopic diverted sleeve gastrectomy with ileal transposition (DSIT). Obes Surg. 2015; 25(7): 1184-90.
5) Foschi DA, Rizzi A, Tubazio I, Conti L, Vago T, Bevilacqua M, et al. Duodenal diverted sleeve gastrectomy with ileal interposition does not cause biliary salt malabsorption. SOARD 2015; 11: 372–378.
6) Celik A, Ugale S. Functional restriction and a new balance between proximal and distal gut: the tools of the real metabolic surgery. Obes Surg. 2014; 24(10): 1742-3.
7) Ugale S, Gupta N, Modi KD, Kota SK, Satwalekar V, Naik V, et al. Prediction of remission after metabolic surgery using a novel scoring system in type 2 diabetes -a retrospective cohort study. J Diabetes Metab Disord. 2014; 13(1): 89.
8) Kota SK, Ugale S, Gupta N, Krishna SV, Modi KD. Ileal Interposition with diverted sleeve gastrectomy for treatment of Type 2 diabetes. Indian J Endocrinol Metab. 2012; 16(2): 458-9.
9) De Paula A, Stival AR, DePaula CL, et al. Surgical treatment of type 2 diabetes in patients with BMI below 35: mid-term outcomes of the laparoscopic ileal interposition associated with a sleeve gastrectomy in 202 consecutive cases. J Gastrointest Surg 2012; 16: 967–76.
10) Kota S, Ugale S, Gupta N, Modi KD. Laparoscopic ileal interposition with diverted sleeve gastrectomy for treatment of type 2 diabetes. Diabetes Metab Syndr. 2012; 6(3): 125-31.
11) Kota S, Ugale S, Gupta N, Naik V, Kumar KV, Modi KD. Ileal interposition with sleeve gastrectomy for treatment of type 2 diabetes mellitus. Indian J Endocrinol Metab. 2012; 16(4): 589-98.
12) De Paula A, Stival AR, Halpern A, et al. Improvement in insulin sensitivity and Β-cell function following ileal interposition with sleeve gastrectomy in type 2 diabetic patients: potential mechanisms. J Gastrointest Surg. 2011; 15: 1344–53.
13) Vencio S, Stival A, Halpern A, Depaula CC, DePaula AL. Early mechanisms of glucose improvement following laparoscopic ileal interposition associated with a sleeve gastrectomy evaluated by the euglycemic hyperinsulinemic clamp in type 2 diabetic patients with BMI below 35. Dig Surg. 2011; 28(4): 293-8.
14) Tinoco A, El-Kadre L, Aquiar L, Tinoco R, Savassi-Rocha P. Short-term and mid-term control of type 2 diabetes mellitus by laparoscopic sleeve gastrectomy with ileal interposition. World J Surg. 2011 Oct;35(10):2238-44.
15) DePaula AL, Stival A, Halpern A, Vencio S. Thirty-day morbidity and mortality of the laparoscopic ileal interposition associated with sleeve gastrectomy for the treatment of type 2 diabetic patients with BMI <35: an analysis of 454 consecutive patients. World J Surg. 2011; 35(1): 102-8.
16) DePaula AL, Stival AR, Halpern A, Vencio S. Surgical treatment of morbid obesity: mid-term outcomes of the laparoscopic ileal interposition associated to a sleeve gastrectomy in 120 patients. Obes Surg. 2011; 21(5): 668-75.
17) DePaula AL, Stival AR, DePaula CC, Halpern A, Vêncio S. Impact on dyslipidemia of the laparoscopic ileal interposition associated to sleeve gastrectomy in type 2 diabetic patients. J Gastrointest Surg. 2010; 14(8): 1319-25.
18) Kumar KV, Ugale S, Gupta N, Naik V, Kumar P, Bhaskar P, et al. Ileal interposition with sleeve gastrectomy for control of type 2 diabetes. Diabetes Technol Ther 2009; 11(12): 785-9.
19) DePaula AL, Macedo AL, Mota BR, Schraibman V. Laparoscopic ileal interposition associated to a diverted sleeve gastrectomy is an effective operation for the treatment of type 2 diabetes mellitus patients with BMI 21-29. Surg Endosc. 2009; 23(6): 1313-20.
20) Lakdawala M, Bhasker A; Asian Consensus Meeting on Metabolic Surgery (ACMOMS). MReport: Asian Consensus Meeting on Metabolic Surgery. Recommendations for the use of Bariatric and Gastrointestinal Metabolic Surgery for Treatment of Obesity and Type II Diabetes Mellitus in the Asian Population: August 9 and 10, 2008, Trivandrum, India. Obes Surg. 2010 Jul;20(7):929-36.

Surgical procedures and techniques